The 1897 Mercer Baptists football team represented Mercer University in the 1897 Southern Intercollegiate Athletic Association football season. They finished with a record of 0–1–1 and were outscored by their opponents 0–26.

Schedule

References

Mercer
Mercer Bears football seasons
College football winless seasons
Mercer Baptists football